Gary Yates may refer to:

Gary Yates (cricketer) (born 1967), English cricketer
Gary Yates (director), Canadian film director